Ninaithale is a 2007 Tamil language film starring Suchindra and Nargis Bagheri. It is a remake of the 2004 Telugu film Anand. It is Suchindra's first Tamil film as the hero. The film is directed by Viswas Sundar who is also the producer for the films Adhu and Chanakya.

Plot
The story opens with Rupa's parents being killed in a car accident by a drunken driver. She is orphaned, but friends and neighbors support her, and she gets a good job. She falls in love with Rahul, her colleague, and she accepts to marry him. On the other side, there is Anand, who has returned from the United States and is forced to attend a family friend's wedding. On the wedding day, he meets the bride Rupa, and it is love at first sight for him, but soon, the wedding is called off because of some arguments between Rupa and her future mother-in-law. Anand is elated because the marriage is canceled. He talks to Rupa and admires her for her boldness. He completely falls in love with her. To win her love, he, among other things, shifts to a house nearer to hers, develops a friendship with her and she starts to love him. But she discovers that Anand's father murdered her parents. The rest of the story is about whether the lovers will be united.

Cast 
 Suchindra as Anand
 Nargis Bagheri as Rupa
 Santhoshi
Krishna as Narayanan 
Baby Palak
Sreya
Sarfraaz as Rahul
Velu Prabhakaran as Anand's father

Production
The movie was earlier entitled Sweet. However, Sundar changed the title because of the announcement of the Tamil Nadu Government that Tamil films with Tamil names will be exempted from entertainment tax.  The shooting of the song "Naanthaanaa Naanthaanaa" took place in Golkonda, capital and fortress city of the Qutb Shahi kingdom, near Hyderabad. Another important scene was shot in Kushaldass Garden in Chennai.

Soundtrack 
Soundtrack was composed by Vijay Antony.

Reception
The film received generally positive reviews but failed to create any impact at the box office due to non-prominent cast. Cinesouth reported the movie was 'sweet'. One Indian website reported that the movie was average, praising the acting of Nargis. Chennai Vision also gave good reviews.

External links

2007 films
Tamil remakes of Telugu films
2000s Tamil-language films
Films scored by Vijay Antony